Jharsuguda railway station is a major railway junction located in the north-western part of the Indian state of Odisha and serves the Jharsuguda district.

History
Jharsuguda railway station came with the opening of the Nagpur–Asansol main line of Bengal Nagpur Railway in 1891. It became a station on the crosscountry Howrah–Nagpur–Mumbai line in 1900. In 1960, Indian Railway took up three projects: the Kottavalasa–Koraput–Jeypore–Kirandaul line ( Dandakaranya Project ), the Titlagarh–Bolangir–Jharsuguda Project and the Rourkela–Kiriburu Project. All the three projects taken together were popularly known as the DBK Project or the Dandakaranya Bolangir Kiriburu Project. It was electrified in 1969–70.

Geography
Jharsuguda is located nearby the Ib river valley. It serves Ib Valley Coalfield and a growing industrial area.

Railway
As of 7 April, 135 trains (including weeklies and bi-weeklies) passed through Jharsuguda railway station.

References

External links
 Trains at Jharsuguda

Railway stations in Jharsuguda district
Railway junction stations in Odisha
Chakradharpur railway division
Railway stations in India opened in 1891